Janusz Kondratiuk (29 September 1943 – 7 October 2019) was a Polish director and writer. He was born in Kazakhstan. He died in Łoś, aged 76.

Filmography as director
1964 – Wielki dzień; etiuda szkolna
1964 – Deszczowy spacer; etiuda szkolna
1965 – Szczęśliwy koniec; etiuda szkolna
1966 – Nie mówmy o tym więcej; etiuda szkolna
1967 – Gwiazdy w oczach; etiuda szkolna
1969 – Jak zdobyć pieniądze, kobietę i sławę
1971 – Niedziela Barabasza
1972 – Dziewczyny do wzięcia
1973 – Wniebowzięci 
1973 – Pies
1975 – Mała sprawa
1976 – Czy jest tu panna na wydaniu?
1982 – Klakier
1987 – Jedenaste przykazanie
1988 – Prywatne niebo
1991 – Głos
1996 – Złote runo
2000 – Noc świętego Mikołaja
2006 – Faceci do wzięcia
2010 – Milion dolarów
2018 – Jak pies z kotem

References

1943 births
2019 deaths
Polish film directors